Accomack County is a United States county located in the eastern edge of the Commonwealth of Virginia. Together, Accomack and Northampton counties make up the Eastern Shore of Virginia, which in turn is part of the Delmarva Peninsula, bordered by the Chesapeake Bay and the Atlantic Ocean. The Accomack county seat is the town of Accomac.

The Eastern Shore of Virginia was known as "Accomac Shire," until it was renamed Northampton County in 1642. The present Accomack County was created from Northampton County in 1663. The county and the original shire were named for the Accawmack Indians, who resided in the area when the English first explored it in 1603.

As of the 2020 census, the total population was 33,413 people. The population of Accomack has remained relatively stable over the last century, though Accomack is one of the poorest parts of Virginia.

History

The county was named for its original residents, the Accomac people, an Eastern Algonquian-speaking Native American tribe.

Members of an English voyage of exploration landed in the area in 1603, four years before the founding of the Jamestown Colony. Captain John Smith visited the region in 1608. The Accomac people at the time numbered around 6,000 and was led by Debedeavon, a paramount chief, whom the English colonists called the "Laughing King." He became a staunch ally of the colonists, granting them several large areas for their own use.

Accomac Shire was established in 1634 as one of the eight original shires of Virginia. The name comes from the native word Accawmacke, which meant "on the other side". In 1642 the name was changed to Northampton by the colonists. Northampton was divided into two counties in 1663. The northern adopted the original name, while the south remained Northampton.

In 1670, the Virginia Colony's Royal Governor William Berkeley abolished Accomac County, but the Virginia General Assembly re-created it in 1671.

In 1940, the General Assembly officially added a "k" to the end of the county's name to arrive at its current spelling. The name of "Accomack County" first appeared in the Decisions of the United States Board on Geographical Names in 1943.

Geography
It is the largest county in Virginia by total area.

Demographics

2020 census

Note: the US Census treats Hispanic/Latino as an ethnic category. This table excludes Latinos from the racial categories and assigns them to a separate category. Hispanics/Latinos can be of any race.

2010 Census
As of the census of 2010, there were 33,164 people, 15,299 households, and 10,388 families residing in the county.  The population density was 84 people per square mile (32/km2).  There were 19,550 housing units at an average density of 43 per square mile (17/km2).  The racial makeup of the county was 65.3% White, 28.1% Black or African American, 0.4% Native American, 0.6% Asian, 0.1% Pacific Islander, 3.9% from other races, and 1.6% from two or more races.  8.6% of the population were Hispanic or Latino of any race.  Black or African American (28%), English American (15%), German (9%), Irish (9%) and Mexican (4%).

There were 15,299 households, out of which 28.90% had children under the age of 18 living with them, 49.20% were married couples living together, 14.40% had a female householder with no husband present, and 32.10% were non-families. 27.70% of all households were made up of individuals, and 12.50% had someone living alone who was 65 years of age or older.  The average household size was 2.45 and the average family size was 2.96.

In the county, the population was spread out, with 24.30% under the age of 18, 8.20% from 18 to 24, 26.20% from 25 to 44, 24.70% from 45 to 64, and 16.70% who were 65 years of age or older.  The median age was 39 years. For every 100 females there were 94.30 males.  For every 100 females age 18 and over, there were 90.00 males.

Accomack and adjacent Northampton County are the two poorest counties in the Commonwealth of Virginia.

Government and politics

Board of Supervisors

Constitutional officers
Clerk of the Circuit Court: Samuel H. Cooper, Jr. (D)
Commissioner of the Revenue: Deborah Midgett (I)
Commonwealth's Attorney: Junius S. Morgan (I)
Sheriff: W. Todd Wessells (I)
Treasurer: James Lilliston, Sr. (I)

Accomack County is represented by Democrat Lynwood W. Lewis, Jr. in the Virginia Senate, Republican Robert Bloxom in the Virginia House of Delegates, and Democrat Elaine Luria in the U.S. House of Representatives.

Presidential politics

Adjacent counties
 Somerset County, Maryland - northwest
 Worcester County, Maryland - northeast
 Northampton County, Virginia - south
 Middlesex County, Virginia - west
 Lancaster County, Virginia - west
 Northumberland County, Virginia - west

National protected areas
 Assateague Island National Seashore (part)
 Chincoteague National Wildlife Refuge (part)
 Martin National Wildlife Refuge (part, Watts Island portion)
 Wallops Island National Wildlife Refuge

Transportation

Airport
Accomack County Airport

Major highways

Education
The county is served by Accomack County Public Schools.

High schools and K-12 schools in this district are:
Arcadia High School
Chincoteague High School
Nandua High School
Tangier Combined School

Eastern Shore Community College is located in Melfa.

Media
The county maintains and is the licensee of six television translator stations on two towers, with four located on a tower off US 13 in unincorporated Mappsville licensed to Onancock, and the other two licensed to unincorporated Craddockville on a tower near Route 178. Each translator tower has four signals to relay the signals of Hampton Roads's major network affiliates to the county, including WAVY, WHRO, WTKR, and WVEC. Meanwhile, Fox programming via WVBT is provided by WPMC-CA (Channel 36) from the Mappsville tower, a station owned by Nexstar Media Group, the parent company of WAVY/WVBT.

Additionally, Salisbury, Maryland CBS / Fox affiliate WBOC-TV has long claimed Accomack County as part of its coverage area.

Communities

Towns

Accomac
Belle Haven, Partially within Northampton County as well
Bloxom
Chincoteague
Hallwood
Keller
Melfa
Onancock
Onley
Painter
Parksley
Saxis
Tangier
Wachapreague

Census Designated Places

Atlantic
Bayside
Bobtown
Boston
Captains Cove
Cats Bridge
Chase Crossing
Deep Creek
Gargatha
Greenbackville
Greenbush
Harborton
Horntown
Lee Mont
Makemie Park
Mappsburg
Mappsville
Metompkin
Modest Town
Nelsonia
New Church
Oak Hall
Pastoria
Pungoteague
Quinby
Sanford
Savage Town
Savageville
Schooner Bay
Southside Chesconessex
Tasley
Temperanceville
Wattsville
Whitesville

Notable people
William Anderson, born in Accomack County, United States Congressman from Pennsylvania
Thomas Evans, (c.1755–1815), born in Accomack County, United States Congressman from Virginia
Lucy Virginia French (1825-1881), writer
George T. Garrison, (1835–1889), born in Accomack County, member of Virginia state legislature and United States Congressman from Virginia
James Hamilton, (c.1710–1783), born in Accomack County, lawyer and mayor of Philadelphia
James Henry, (1731–1804), born in Accomack County, lawyer and delegate to the Continental Congress
Ralph Northam, (1957-), born and raised in Accomack County, 73rd Governor of Virginia
David P. Weber (? -), resident of Accomack County, lawyer, professor and forensic accountant, who was a prominent whistleblower in the Bernard L. Madoff misconduct and Chinese Espionage matters
Henry A. Wise, (1806–1876), Minister to Brazil, Governor of Virginia and Confederate General

In popular culture

Music

In Sydney Brown's lyrics for the Maple Leaf Rag, the first line states "I come from ol' Virginny, from de County Accomack"

See also
National Register of Historic Places listings in Accomack County, Virginia

References

Further reading

External links

Official Website of Accomack County, VA
Accomack County, Virginia Genealogy, History and Records

 
Virginia counties
1671 establishments in Virginia
Virginia shires
Virginia counties on the Chesapeake Bay
Populated places established in 1671
Arson in Virginia